The Baloise Ladies Tour (formerly the BeNe Ladies Tour) is a women's staged cycle race which takes place in Belgium and the Netherlands and is currently rated by the UCI as category 2.1.

Overall winners

Classification jerseys
 General classification leader
 Points classification leader
 Youth classification leader

External links
 (Dutch)

References 

 Cycle races in the Netherlands
Women's cycle races
Cycle races in Belgium